The slender-necked sea snake (Hydrophis coggeri), also known commonly as Cogger's sea snake, is a species of marine venomous snake in the subfamily Hydrophiinae of the family Elapidae. The species is native to waters around western Australia and the southern Pacific Ocean.

Etymology
The specific name, coggeri, is in honor of Australian herpetologist Harold Cogger.

Geographic range
H. coggeri is found in marine waters around Fiji, the Loyalty Islands, New Caledonia, and western Australia. The type locality is in Fiji.

Habitat

Diet
H. coggeri preys upon eels.

Reproduction
H. coggeri is viviparous. A gravid female was found to contain three embryos.

References

Further reading
Cogger HG (2014). Reptiles and Amphibians of Australia, Seventh Edition. Clayton, Victoria, Australia: CSIRO Publishing. xxx + 1,033 pp. .
Wilson S, Swan G (2013). A Complete Guide to Reptiles of Australia, Fourth Edition. Sydney: New Holland Publishers. 522 pp. .
Kharin V (1984). "[A review of sea snakes of the group Hydrophis sensu lato (Serpentes, Hydrophiidae). 3. The genus Leioselasma]". Zoologicheskii Zhurnal 63 (10): 1535–1546. (Leioselasma coggeri, new species, p. 1538). (in Russian).
Rasmussen AR, Sanders KL, Guinea ML, Amey AP (2014). "Sea snakes in Australian waters (Serpentes: subfamilies Hydrophiinae and Laticaudinae)—a review with an updated identification key". Zootaxa 3869 (4): 351–371.

Hydrophis
Snakes of Australia
Snakes of New Caledonia
Reptiles described in 1984